Maja can refer to:

Places
 Maja, Croatia, a village
 Maja, Banten, a subdistrict in Lebak Regency, Banten, Indonesia
 Maja railway station
 Maja, West Java, a subdistrict in Majalengka Regency, West Java, Indonesia
 Maja River, a tributary of the Angke River, Jakarta, Indonesia
 Maja (peak), a mountain peak in Kosovo 
 Maja (river), a river in Romania
 Mája, the Hungarian name for Maia village, Bereni Commune, Mureș County, Romania
 66 Maja, a main-belt asteroid

People
 Maja (given name), a feminine given name
 Charles Maja (1966–2020), South African actor
 Josh Maja (born 1998), English footballer
 Otto Maja (born 1987), Finnish street artist
 Maja, the feminine form of majo, a low-class Spaniard of the 18th and 19th century

Animals
 Maja (boa constrictor), a species in the Cuban cactus scrub
 Maja (crab), a genus of crabs in the family Majidae

See also
 Maia (disambiguation)
 La maja desnuda, a painting by Spanish artist Francisco Goya
 La maja vestida, a painting by Spanish artist Francisco Goya
 Majaa, 2005 Indian Tamil-language action film
 Maya (disambiguation)
 Mya (disambiguation)